Ducrot may refer to:

Auguste-Alexandre Ducrot (1817-1882), a French general
Ducrot SLD, an Italian fighter prototype
Oswald Ducrot, (1930-) a French linguist